Eduardo David "Edu" Espiau Hernández (born 19 December 1994) is a Spanish footballer who plays for SD Ponferradina as a forward.

Club career
Espiau was born in Las Palmas, Canary Islands, and finished his formation with AD Barrio Atlántico. In 2013 he joined Acodetti CF in the regional leagues, and made his debut as a senior during the campaign.

In 2016 Espiau joined UD Las Palmas, initially assigned to the C-team also in the lower leagues. He helped the side achieve promotion to Tercera División in his first season by scoring 23 goals, and added a further ten in his second before being promoted to the reserves in December 2017.

On 16 August 2018, Espiau was promoted to the main squad in Segunda División, but was demoted back to the B-side on 31 August. On 13 August of the following year, he was loaned to Villarreal CF B for the season.

Upon returning, Espiau was assigned back to the main squad, and made his professional debut on 12 September 2020 by starting in a 0–1 away loss against CD Leganés. He scored his first professional goal fourteen days later, netting the equalizer in a 2–2 away draw against Real Zaragoza.

On 1 July 2021, Espiau moved to fellow second division side SD Ponferradina.

References

External links

1994 births
Living people
Footballers from Las Palmas
Spanish footballers
Association football forwards
Segunda División players
Segunda División B players
Tercera División players
Divisiones Regionales de Fútbol players
UD Las Palmas C players
UD Las Palmas Atlético players
UD Las Palmas players
Villarreal CF B players
SD Ponferradina players